is a railway station on the Jōetsu Line in the city of Minamiuonuma, Niigata, Japan, operated by the East Japan Railway Company (JR East).  It is also a freight terminal for the Japan Freight Railway Company.

Lines

Station layout
The station has  a single ground-level side platform and an island platform serving three tracks. The station is unattended.

Platforms

History
Itsukamachi Station opened on 18 November 1923. Upon the privatization of the Japanese National Railways (JNR) on 1 April 1987, it came under the control of JR East.

Surrounding area
Itsukamachi Elementary School
Itsukamachi Ski Resort

See also
 List of railway stations in Japan

External links

 Istukamachi Station information (JR East) 

Railway stations in Niigata Prefecture
Railway stations in Japan opened in 1923
Stations of East Japan Railway Company
Stations of Japan Freight Railway Company
Jōetsu Line
Minamiuonuma